The Orbit fixed-route bus system began in 1990 in response to the growing population and congestion of the city of Huntsville, Alabama. The system is run by the city of Huntsville, and is funded by city and federal funds.  (Alabama law prohibits state funding of public transit.)

History
Huntsville had a streetcar system in the early 1900s linking downtown to outlying mill villages like
Five Points and Lowe Mill. The system was dismantled in the late 1940s.
In 1990, the city of Huntsville decided to form the Department of Parking and Public Transit, which included
the Shuttle. It began with two routes, the Red and Blue Core Loops which served downtown, the Medical District
and surrounding areas. By 2004, the system had expanded to ten routes and a Tourist Trolley. That year,
a new bus terminal was built at Church and Cleveland Streets near the Huntsville Depot. In 2005, the city
began weekend evening service to the downtown and Five Points areas. In 2006, bike racks were installed on all
fifteen buses as part of the city's Greenway Master Plan.

The system today
The Shuttle has a total of 9 routes, including 9 weekday routes,9 Saturday routes, the Tourist Trolley Loop, which seasonally runs six days a week, and two weekend evening routes. Routes 10, and 12 were discontinued in 2010. The system keeps a fleet of 15 buses. The regular weekday routes run from 6 AM to 9 PM. Saturday routes runs 7am to 7pm. The Tourist Loop runs from 7 AM to 7 PM. The weekend evening routes run from 7 PM to 2 AM on Friday and Saturday. Bus turnarounds
range from 15 minutes downtown to one hour in outlying areas. Between 1,500 and 1,800 riders use the system daily. The number has steadily risen in recent years due to rising gas prices; however, while other transit systems have seen double-digit gains in ridership over the past year, the Shuttle's ridership has only grown by 5%. This prompted the city council to hire a consulting firm in August 2008 to see how the city can make the system more attractive to residents.

Fares
One-way:
Regular: $1
Seniors, students with valid ID, and children: $.50
Tourist Trolley: $2
Downtown weekend evening service: Free
Transfers: Free

Other Services
The City of Huntsville Department of Parking and Public Transit also maintains the 13 public parking garages and lots in downtown Huntsville, the Access paratransit fleet, and RIDE-SHARE, the Huntsville-area carpool program. In June 2008, the department also began managing the neighboring city of Madison's paratransit system, MARS.

Future plans
A park and ride is planned at Bridge Street Town Centre, a mixed-use development in Cummings Research Park West, and will become a transit hub for the western part of the city.  Other park-and-rides have been discussed, but no specific locations have been selected.

Routes to the following places have been planned/discussed for when funding becomes available:
 Huntsville International Airport
 Redstone Arsenal/Marshall Space Flight Center

Other long-range transit projects that have been discussed for the Huntsville area:
 A commuter rail line between Huntsville and Decatur, with stops in Madison and Research Park.
 A light rail line linking downtown Huntsville to Ditto Landing on the Tennessee River.

Routes
1. Red Core Loop
Madison County Courthouse, Huntsville Museum of Art, Huntsville Hospital, Parkway Place Mall, Huntsville Senior Center/Brahan Spring Park
2. Blue Core Loop
Same as #1, but in reverse, with one additional stop at Carousel Skate Center
3. Madison Square/Holmes Avenue
University of Alabama in Huntsville, Research Park East, Madison Square Mall
4. Madison Square/University Drive
University Drive commercial area, Madison Square Mall, Perimeter Office Park
5. Airport Road
Von Braun Center, Parkway Place Mall, Crestwood Medical Center, Huntsville Hospital Medical Mall
6. Southwest Huntsville
Von Braun Center, Westlawn, Brahan Springs Park/Senior Center, Milton Frank Stadium
7. Alabama A&M University
JF Drake State Technical College, Alabama A&M University, Five Points
8. Medaris Road/A&M
Alabama Career Center, JF Drake State Technical College, Alabama A&M University, Five Points
9. Northwest Huntsville/ Oakwood College
The Fountain Shopping Center, Oakwood College, Alabama Career Center
10. Weatherly Road (Discontinued and partially moved to 5)
Parkway Place, Airport Road, Jones Valley, Southeast Huntsville, Joe Davis Stadium
12. Research Park Loop (Discontinued)
UAH, Calhoun Community College, Sherwood Park, Bridge Street Town Centre, Research Park West, Westside Pavilion (Target), University Drive
T. Tourist Loop Trolley
University Drive, Madison Square Mall, Research Park East, US Space and Rocket Center, Huntsville Botanical Garden,
Huntsville Museum of Art, EarlyWorks, Alabama Constitution Village, Courthouse Square
Weekend Evening Service
Five Points, the Medical District, the Von Braun Center, Big Spring Park (Huntsville, Alabama), and various restaurants and clubs. Runs on Fridays and Saturdays from 7PM-2AM only.

Roster

References

External links
 City of Huntsville Department of Parking and Public Transit
 Shuttle System Map

Bus transportation in Alabama
Transportation in Huntsville, Alabama